Cincarević is a Serbian surname, derived from the word cincar, meaning "Aromanian".

At least 1 individual with the surname died at the Jasenovac concentration camp.

It may refer to:

Biljana Cincarević, Serbian contemporary painter

References

Serbian surnames